Pachnephorus moseykoi is a species of leaf beetle found in Senegal, Gambia, Guinea Bissau, Sierra Leone, Mali, Ghana, the Republic of the Congo, Sudan and Ethiopia, described by Stefano Zoia in 2007. It is named after Alexey G. Moseyko, a specialist in Eumolpinae (a subfamily of Chrysomelidae).

References

Eumolpinae
Beetles of Africa
Insects of West Africa
Insects of the Republic of the Congo
Insects of Sudan
Insects of Ethiopia
Beetles described in 2007